Ruben Bemelmans and Philipp Petzschner were the defending champions but chose not to defend their title.

Kevin Krawietz and Albano Olivetti won the title after defeating Roman Jebavý and Andrej Martin 6–7(8–10), 6–4, [10–7] in the final.

Seeds

Draw

References
 Main Draw

Bauer Watertechnology Cup - Doubles